Ultimate Spider-Man is an animated television series based on the superhero Spider-Man. The series premiered on Disney XD on April 1, 2012, airing alongside the second season of The Avengers: Earth's Mightiest Heroes, as part of the Marvel Universe block. The series is based on the Ultimate Spider-Man comic book series.

Series overview

Episodes

Season 1 (2012)

Season 2 (2013)

Season 3: Web-Warriors (2014–15) 
The third season, subtitled Web-Warriors, introduced a variation of the Spider-Verse arc. It first premiered in India and then in US.

Season 4: Ultimate Spider-Man vs. the Sinister 6 (2016–17) 
On June 1, 2015, it was announced that the series has been renewed for a fourth season, retitled Ultimate Spider-Man vs the Sinister 6. The season premiered with a one-hour episode titled "Hydra Attacks" on February 21, 2016.

Notes

References 

Lists of American children's animated television series episodes
Lists of Spider-Man television series episodes